{{Infobox RPG
|title=Curse of the Chthonians
|subtitle=Four Odysseys into Deadly Intrigue
|publisher=Chaosium
|date=
|image=Curse of the Chthonians.jpg
|caption=2nd edition cover by Tom Sullivan, 2011
|system=Basic Role-Playing
|genre=Horror
|designer=
|isbn=9781568823485
}}Curse of the Chthonians is a 1984 role-playing game adventure for Call of Cthulhu published by Chaosium.

ContentsCurse of the Chthonians consists of four scenarios, "Dark Carnival" by David Hargrave; "The Curse of Chaugnar Faugn" by Bill Barton; and the linked scenarios, "Thoth's Dagger" and "The City Without a Name" by William Hamblin.

Reception
Stephen Kyle reviewed Curse of the Chthonians for White Dwarf #59, giving it an overall rating of 9 out of 10, and stated that "All of them are very highly recommended as superb examples of how to design thrilling, well-crafted scenarios."

Richard Lee reviewed Curse of the Cthonians for Imagine magazine, and stated that "The presentation of Curse is exemplary. The layout is neat and logical. the artwork relevant, and the texts very well written. Really, there is little to fault, unless it be the potential deadlines of some of the finales. All in all, if one-off scenarios are your thing, Curse is a must."

Aaron Allston reviewed Curse of the Chthonians in The Space Gamer No. 73. Allston commented that "I'd recommend you buy Curse of the Chthonians, in spite of its shortcomings. A good Keeper can make Carnival into quite an event. An afternoon in your local library will make Dagger/City into a colorful, exotic episode. And Curse'' is a well-rounded, fast-moving scenario with a healthy helping of period flavor. It's a good package."

References

Call of Cthulhu (role-playing game) adventures
Role-playing game supplements introduced in 1984